Ida C. Pruitt (1888–1985), a China-born American social worker, author, speaker, interpreter and activist in Sino-American understanding. Her biographer called her "China's American Daughter." In the 1920s and 1930s she supervised social work in the Peking Union Medical College, then after the outbreak of the Second Sino-Japanese War was a major actor in the Chinese Industrial Cooperatives. After the Chinese Communist Revolution of 1949, she retired to the United States but continued to advocate warmer relations with China.

Early life
Ida Pruitt was the daughter of North China Southern Baptist missionaries Anna Seward Pruitt and C.W. Pruitt. Born in 1888 in the coastal town of Penglai on the Shandong peninsula, her childhood was spent in the small inland village of Songjia, Shandong, where for many years the Pruitts were the only Western family.

After attending Cox College in College Park, Georgia (1906–1909),  Ida Pruitt received a B.S. from Columbia University Teachers' College in New York City (1910). When her brother John died, Ida returned to China to be with her family and became a teacher and principal of Wai Ling School for Girls in Chefoo (1912–1918). In 1918, she came back to the United States and studied social work in Boston and Philadelphia until hired by the Rockefeller Foundation in New York as head of the Department of Social Services at the Peking Union Medical College (PUMC) where she remained until 1938.

Japanese occupation

During the Japanese occupation of China (1937–1945), Ida assisted Rewi Alley as he organized the Chinese Industrial Cooperatives. The CIC was formed to organize cooperative factories throughout the countryside to support China's industry. Schools were built to train the Chinese (often crippled or orphaned) to work in and manage the factories. Indusco, the fundraising arm of the CIC in the United States, was formed, and Pruitt served as its executive secretary from 1939 to 1951.

Author
Pruitt wrote books, stories, and articles, including several autobiographies: A China Childhood (1978), The Years Between, and Days in Old Peking: May 1921 – October 1938. Her "as told to" autobiography – Daughter of Han: The Autobiography of a Chinese Working Woman (1945) became widely read when it was republished in paperback by Stanford University Press in 1967. This book was followed by Old Madame Yin: A Memoir of Peking Life, 1926–1938 (1979), and Tales of Old China. She also translated and edited many works, including Yellow Storm (better known as Four Generations Under One Roof) by Lao She (1951), The Flight of an Empress by Wu Yung (1936), Little Bride by Wang Yung, and Beyond China's City Walls by George A. Hogg, et al.

Personal life
In 1946, she rented an apartment with Maud Russell on West 93rd Street in New York City and remained there until 1961 when she retired and moved to Philadelphia near the University of Pennsylvania where she remained for the rest of her life.

While living in Beijing Ida adopted two girls, one Chinese, Kueiching [Kwei-ching], the other a Russian refugee, Tania Manooiloff. They were educated in English schools in China, then sent to the United States. Kueiching married Tommy Ho, a radiologist from Canada, in 1940; they settled in Saskatchewan, Canada, and had two children: Timmy and Nancy. Her other daughter, Tania Manooiloff, taught Russian at Swarthmore College . She married Cornelius "Cornie" Cosman, a metallurgist who worked for the US Department of the Interior. They had four children: Catherine Helen, Anna Ida, Michaela and Hugh. After Cosman's death, she married Mr. Wahl.

Ida Pruitt died on July 24, 1985, in Philadelphia.

Unreferenced text mostly taken from the Radcliff Finding Aid. See link below.

See also
Anna Seward Pruitt
C.W. Pruitt
Lottie Moon
Rewi Alley
Gung Ho – industrial worker's cooperative
19th-century Protestant missions in China
List of Protestant missionaries in China
Christianity in China

Notes

References

External links
Ida Pruitt Papers.Schlesinger Library , Radcliffe Institute, Harvard University.
Papers of Ida Pruitt and Marjorie King, 1891–1994. Schlesinger Library, Radcliffe Institute, Harvard University.
World Catalog Entry for Flight of an empress, told by Wu Yung, whose other name is Yu-ch'uan; transcribed by Liu K'un; translated and edited by Ida Pruitt; introduction by Kenneth Scott Latourette.
World Catalog Entry for A Daughter of Han: The Autobiography of a Chinese Working Woman
World Catalog entry for Yellow storm by Lau Shaw pseud. of S. Y. Shu; translated from the Chinese by Ida Pruitt.(1951)
World Catalog Entry for World Ida Pruitt: A China Childhood (1978)
World Catalog entry for Old Madam Yin: A Memoir of Peking Life (1979)

1888 births
1985 deaths
American expatriates in China
Baptists from the United States
Writers from Yantai
Cox College (Georgia) alumni
Teachers College, Columbia University alumni
American autobiographers
Women autobiographers
20th-century American non-fiction writers
20th-century American women writers
Children of American missionaries in China
American women non-fiction writers